A referendum on state symbols was held in the Republic of Serbia on 31 May 1992. The referendum decided the flag, the national anthem and the coat of arms. Although the referendum failed due to low turnout, the National Assembly recommended that the red star be removed from the Serbian flag on 21 June.

Background
The referendum was planned since 1991. For the state flag, the choice was to either keep the flag with the red star or to remove it. For the coat of arms, the choice was to keep the Serbian shield with cross and firesteels or to include the bicephalic eagle of the Nemanjić dynasty. For the anthem, Bože pravde and Marš na Drinu were offered. The results showed a majority of voters preferred keeping the red star on the flag, to keep the Serbian shield with firesteels, and choosing Marš na Drinu as the anthem.

Results

Coat of arms

Flag

National anthem

See also

Referendums in Serbia

References

1992 referendums
Referendums in Serbia
Referendums in Yugoslavia
1992 in Yugoslavia
1992 in Serbia
Constitutional referendums
May 1992 events in Europe